Grabieniec  is a village in the administrative district of Gmina Turek, within Turek County, Greater Poland Voivodeship, in west-central Poland.

The village has a population of 329.

References

Grabieniec